From the Devil to a Stranger is an album by Nic Jones, released in 1978.

Track listing
"The Singer's Request" 2:34
"Some Say the Devil's Dead" 2:26
"Billy Don't You Weep for Me" 4:24
"William Glen" 5:50
"The Blind Harper" 4:10
"The Singer's Request" 0:43
"The Little Heathy Hill" 2:33
"Far from Home" 1:55
"Master Kilby" 3:53
"The Lakes of Shilin" 4:49
"Newport Street" 4:19
"The Green Mossy Banks of the Lea" 5:35
"The Singer's Request" 1:03

References

1978 albums
Nic Jones albums